"Shoddy" millionaires was a derogatory term for the war profiteers in the North during the American Civil War. Allegedly, they supplied the Union army with faulty uniforms made from reprocessed "shoddy" wool rather than virgin wool. 

Shoddy millionaires also allegedly made shoes from cardboard that would dissolve when the soldiers marched in water or mud.

References

Economic history of the American Civil War
Class-related slurs